Bassetts Island is a "Y"-shaped island within Pocasset Harbor and Red Brook Harbor, in Bourne, Massachusetts, USA. 41-40’48” North x 070-38’13” West

Is located between two Peninsulas, Wings Neck to the North and Scraggy Neck to the South, and is geographically separated into four portions, the central, northeast, southeast, and the western. The island is approximately 60 acres of woodland, marshland and beach.

The island is inhabited year round with one house on the western portion and five houses on the northeastly portion. There are no roads on the island, but with the exception of the southernly portion, there is a minor path that runs throughout the island.  The island can only be accessed via boat and has no utility services to the island.

There are two channels, one on the North Side and one on the South side. The North channel provides access to Pocassett Harbor and the Barlow's Landing Boat Ramp. The South channel provides access to Red Brook Harbor, Kingman Yacht Club, Parker's Boat Yard, Hen Cove and the Hen Cove boat ramp, Hospital Cove and the Red Brook Herring Run. The South Channel be shallow and tight due to a large sand bar that extends from the Southern tip of the island.

The Western side of the Southern tip provides great boat accessible swimming and a sandy beach.  In contrast, the Eastern side of the Southern tip has rocky beach.  Anchorage can be found on the North, East and West sides of the island, but the Westerly anchorage isn't as protected as the other two.  During the summer months, the Easterly side of the island is a favorite among locals.

The island's history dates back to the mid 1600s when it was owned by William Numuck, a Wampanoag, whom also owned most of Pocasset and Cataumet stretching from the Pocasset River to the Falmouth Town line and also included Numuck's Island (Auntchishogquechike Island).

Location
The island is southeast of Wings Neck, west of Patuisset (neighborhood) & Handy Point, northwest of Long Point, and northeast of Scraggy Neck & the Anchorage.

Portions

Central
The central portion of the island is the most forested area on the island. Also, there are two small salt ponds on the central portion which connect with Red Brook Harbor.

Northeast
The northeast portion of the island is moderately forested. There is a small inland pond. Also, there are several residential buildings spread out along the northeast portion.

Southeast
The southeast portion is the least forested portion of the island. Half of the portion is  marshy, but the southeast portion has the sandiest coastline on the island. There are no buildings nor man-made structures on this portion of the island.

West
The western portion, the widest and shortest arm of the island, is sparsely forested. There is some marshy land on the eastern side, extending towards the center of the arm. On the western side are several buildings, a tennis court, and a pier.

References

External links
Map: 

Bourne, Massachusetts
Islands of Barnstable County, Massachusetts
Coastal islands of Massachusetts